Antonio Milanese (1 December 1912 - ?) was an Italian triple jumper who was 6th in the triple jump at the 1934 European Athletics Championships.

Achievements

See also
 Italy at the 1934 European Athletics Championships

References

External links
 Antonio Milanese at Les-Sports.info

1912 births
Date of death missing
Place of death missing
Italian male triple jumpers
Sportspeople from Turin